Thomas Frederick Broadbridge (born 1943) is a British-Australian film producer.

Early life
He grew up in Grantham in England. He attended the Boys' Central School. His parents lived Grantham, and his sister Betty Allen lived on Manor Drive in Great Gonerby.

Career
He moved from Lincolnshire to run a pub in Gibraltar, then moved to Australia in 1973.

Select Credits
Crooked Mick (1979 TV series)
Felicity (1979 Film)
Dead Man's Float (1979 Film)
Cornflakes for Tea (1988 TV series)
Blood Money (1980)
Smugglers Cove (1980)
BMX Bandits (1983)
Jenny Kissed Me (film)  (1985)
Contagion (1987)
Coda (1987)
Kadaicha (1988)
The 13th Floor (1988)
Out of the Body (1988 film)
To Make a Killing (1988 Film)
Never Cry Devil (1989 Film)
Prime Suspect (1989 Film)
Wishful Thinking (1989 Film)
Hidden Obsession (1992 Film)
Unlawful Passage (1993 Film)
Bingo and Molly (1998 TV series)
The Viusual Bible Series (1997)
The Children's Animated Bible (2004 Series)

References

External links

Australian film producers
People from Grantham
Living people
1943 births